Lgota  is a village in the administrative district of Gmina Trzebinia, within Chrzanów County, Lesser Poland Voivodeship, in southern Poland. The village is located in the historical region Galicia.

References

Villages in Chrzanów County